The 9th Cannes Film Festival was held from 23 April to 10 May 1956. The Palme d'Or went to The Silent World by Jacques-Yves Cousteau and Louis Malle. The festival opened with Marie-Antoinette reine de France, directed by Jean Delannoy and closed with Il tetto by Vittorio De Sica.

In an effort to resolve some issues caused by the Cold War climate of the time, like special treatment towards Americans (who gave financial assistance to the festival) which displeased the Eastern Bloc, a decision to have films withdrawn under certain conditions had been put in place. This decision in turn had become a divisive issue in the festival, as it was seen as censorship. In 1956 it was decided to eliminate all such censorship from the selection and thereby start a new era in the festival.

Jury
The following people were appointed as the Jury of the 1956 competition:

Feature films
Maurice Lehmann (France) Jury President
Arletty (France)
Louise de Vilmorin (France)
Jacques-Pierre Frogerais (France)
Henri Jeanson (France)
Domenico Meccoli (Italy)
Otto Preminger (USA)
James Quinn (UK)
Roger Regent (France)
María Romero (Chile)
Sergei Vasilyev (Soviet Union)
Short films
Francis Bolen (Belgium)
Antonin Brousil (Czechoslovakia)
Henri Fabiani (France)
Paul Grimault (France)
Jean Perdrix (France)

Feature film competition
The following feature films competed for the Palme d'Or:

Afternoon of the Bulls (Tarde de toros) by Ladislao Vajda
Christ in Bronze (Seido no Kirisuto) by Minoru Shibuya
Dalibor by Václav Krška
The Girl in Black (To Koritsi me ta mavra) by Michael Cacoyannis
Hanka by Slavko Vorkapić
The Harder They Fall by Mark Robson
The Hidden One (La escondida) by Roberto Gavaldón
I Live in Fear (Ikimono no kiroku) by Akira Kurosawa
I'll Cry Tomorrow by Daniel Mann
Item One (Tochka parva) by Boyan Danovski
The Leech (Shabab emraa) by Salah Abu Seif
The Man in the Gray Flannel Suit by Nunnally Johnson
The Man Who Knew Too Much by Alfred Hitchcock
The Man Who Never Was by Ronald Neame
Marie Antoinette Queen of France (Marie-Antoinette reine de France) by Jean Delannoy
Merry-Go-Round (Körhinta)' by Zoltán Fábri
Mother (Mat) by Mark Donskoi
Mozart by Karl Hartl
The Mystery of Picasso (Le mystère Picasso) by Henri-Georges Clouzot
Othello by Sergei Yutkevich
Pather Panchali by Satyajit Ray
The Phantom Horse (Maboroshi no uma) by Koji Shima
The Protar Affair (Afacerea Protar) by Haralambie Boros
The Railroad Man (Il ferroviere) by Pietro Germi
Road to Life (Pedagogicheskaya poema) by Aleksei Maslyukov and Mechislava Mayevskaya
The Roof (Il tetto) by Vittorio De Sica
Seagulls Die in the Harbour (Meeuwen sterven in de haven) by Roland Verhavert, Ivo Michiels and Rik Kuypers
Seven Years in Tibet by Hans Nieter
Shadow (Cien) by Jerzy Kawalerowicz
Shevagyachya Shenga by Shantaram Athavale
The Silent World (Le Monde du silence) by Jacques-Yves Cousteau and Louis Malle
Smiles of a Summer Night (Sommarnattens leende) by Ingmar Bergman
Sob o Céu da Bahia by Ernesto Remani
Talpa by Alfredo B. Crevenna
El Último perro by Lucas Demare
The Unwilling Doctor (Toubib el affia) by Henry Jacques
Walk Into Paradise by Lee Robinson
Wild Love (Gli innamorati) by Mauro Bolognini
Yield to the Night by J. Lee Thompson

Short film competition
The following short films competed for the Short Film Palme d'Or:

 Aéroport de Luxembourg by Philippe Schneider
 Andre Modeste Gretry by Lucien Deroisy
 Le ballon rouge by Albert Lamorisse
 Bwana Kitoko by André Cauvin
 Ciganytanc by Tamas Banovich
 Columbia Musical Travelark: Wonders of Manhattan by Harry Foster
 La corsa delle rocche by Gian Luigi Polidoro
 Crne vode by Rudolf Sremec
 En de zee was niet meer by Bert Haanstra
 The Face of Lincoln by Edward Freed
 Festival Melody (Melodii festivalia) by Jerzy Bossak, R. Grigoriev, Ilya Kopalin, Iosif Poselski
 Fuji wa ikiteiru by Kenji Shimomura
 Gateway To the Antarctic by Duncan Carse
 Gerald McBoing on Planet Moo or Gerald McBoing! Boing! on Planet Moo by Robert Cannon
 Growing Coconuts by Fali Bilimoria
 Horizons nouveaux by Kurt Baum
 Karius and Bactus (Karius og Baktus) by Ivo Caprino
 Kati és a vadmacska by Ágoston Kollányi
 Katsura rikyu by Minoru Kuribayashi
 Loutky Jiriho Trnky by Bruno Sefranek
 Magdana's Donkey (Lurdzha Magdany) by Tengiz Abuladze and Rezo Chkheidze
 Marinica by Ion Popescu-Gopo
 Nicolae Grigorescu by Ion Bostan
 Parabola d'oro by Vittorio De Seta
 Les pécheurs du cap by Errol Hinds
 Portrait of Soutland by Peter Roger Hunt
 Povest za tirnovgrad by Yuri Arnaudov
 Salut à la France by Ric Eyrich, Thomas L. Rowe
 Salzburger Impressionen by Prof. Hanns Wagula
 The Shepherd by Julian Biggs
 Stvoreni syeta by E. Hofman
 Svedocanstva o tesli by Vladimir Pogacic
 Tant qu'il y aura des bêtes by Braissai
 Teatr lalek by Marian Ussorowski
 Together by Lorenza Mazzetti
 Tovarishch ukhodit v more by Nikita Kurikhin
 Vand fra eufrat by Theodor Christensen

Awards

Official awards
The following films and people received the 1956 awards:
Palme d'Or: The Silent World (Le Monde du silence) by Jacques-Yves Cousteau and Louis Malle
Jury Special Prize: The Mystery of Picasso (Le mystère Picasso) by Henri-Georges Clouzot
Best Director: Sergei Yutkevich for Othello
Best Acting Award: Susan Hayward for I'll Cry Tomorrow (in 1955 and 1956 this award was given without gender differentiation)
Best Human Document: Pather Panchali by Satyajit Ray
Best Poetic Humour: Smiles of a Summer Night (Sommarnattens leende) by Ingmar Bergman
Short films
Short Film Palme d'Or: The Red Balloon by Albert Lamorisse
Best Fiction Film: Magdana's Donkey (Lurdza magdany) by Tengiz Abuladze and Rezo Chkheidze
Best Documentary:
Andre Modeste Gretry by Lucien Deroisy
La corsa delle rocche by Gian Luigi Polidoro
Special Mention: Loutky Jiriho Trnky (The Puppets of Jiri Trnka) by Bruno Sefranek
Special Mention - Investigative Film: 
Together by Lorenza Mazzetti
Tant qu'il y aura des bêtes by Braissai

Independent awards
OCIC Award
 The Roof (Il tetto) by Vittorio De Sica
 Special Mention:
The Railroad Man (Il ferroviere) by Pietro Germi
The Man in the Gray Flannel Suit by Nunnally Johnson
Pather Panchali by Satyajit Ray

References

Media

British Pathé: Cannes Film Festival 1956 footage
British Pathé: Originals Cannes Film Festival 1956 footage
British Pathé: "Stars in the sun" 1956 Festival footage
INA: Atmosphere at the 1956 Festival (commentary in French)
INA: Opening of the 1956 festival (commentary in French)
INA: Closing evening of the 1956 Festival (commentary in French)

External links 
1956 Cannes Film Festival (web.archive)
Official website Retrospective 1956 
Cannes Film Festival:1956 at Internet Movie Database

Cannes Film Festival, 1956
Cannes Film Festival, 1956
Cannes Film Festival